Alexander Henderson (1807 - 1888) was a Scottish Episcopalian priest: he was the Dean of  Glasgow and Galloway from 1859 until 1877.

Henderson was educated at King's College, Aberdeen and ordained in 1842. After a curacy in Leith he spent the rest of his career in Hamilton.

References

1807 births
Alumni of the University of Aberdeen
Scottish Episcopalian priests
Deans of Glasgow and Galloway
1888 deaths